Pseudohongiella is a genus of bacteria from the order of unclassified Gammaproteobacteria.

References

Gammaproteobacteria
Bacteria genera